Patrik Žitný (born 21 January 1999) is a Czech football player. He plays for Mladá Boleslav.

Club career
He made his Czech First League debut for Teplice on 17 February 2018 in a game against Jablonec.

References

External links
 
 Patrik Žitný at FAČR
 

1999 births
Living people
Czech footballers
Czech Republic youth international footballers
Czech Republic under-21 international footballers
Association football midfielders
FK Teplice players
Czech First League players